The women's 500 meter at the 2022 KNSB Dutch Single Distance Championships took place in Heerenveen at the Thialf ice skating rink on Saturday 30 October 2021. Although the tournament was held in 2021 it was the 2022 edition as it was part of the 2021–2022 speed skating season.
There were 24 participants who raced twice over 500m so that all skaters had to start once in the inner lane and once in the outer lane. The first 5 skaters were eligible for the following World Cup tournaments.

Statistics

Result

Draw 1st 500m

Draw 2nd 500m

Referee: Berri de Jonge. Assistant: Suzan van den Belt. Starter: Janny Smegen 
Start: 14:10.00 hr.  Finish: 14:32.37

Source:

References

Single Distance Championships
2022 Single Distance
World